Nottingham General Hospital was a major hospital in Nottingham, England. It was founded in 1781 and closed in 1992.

History

The hospital was the result of a legacy from John Key, a wealthy banker, who had left money in his will for hospitals to be built in Nottingham and York. The site selected for the hospital in Nottingham was part of the area known as Nottingham Park, immediately to the north of Nottingham Castle and near the wharves: one half of the land was given by Thomas Pelham-Clinton, 3rd Duke of Newcastle for the purpose and the other half by the town corporation.

The foundation stone for the first building, which had been designed by John Simpson, was laid on 12 February 1781 and the hospital opened with 44 beds in September 1782. John Wesley, the theologian, was an early visitor to the hospital.

The hospital was extended with the Derbyshire wing, financed by a large donation from Henry Cavendish, which opened in 1787.

In 1844 the hospital had to respond to a major disaster when 12 people were killed and over a hundred injured when a stand collapsed at a public hanging on Garner's Hill.

A design for a third storey for the original building was developed by Thomas Chambers Hine and the works completed in 1855. Another new wing on the Park Row frontage opened in 1879, and the Jubilee Wing, designed by Alfred Waterhouse in a circular shape to celebrate Queen Victoria's Diamond Jubilee, opened in 1900.

During the First World War 102 beds were made available to the Government for wounded soldiers.

The Nurses Memorial Home was opened by the Prince of Wales in 1923 as a monument to the soldiers of Nottinghamshire who had died in the First World War. Extensions financed by donations from William Goodacre Player included the Ropewalk Wing opened by Princess Mary in 1929, the Player Wing opened in 1932 and the Castle Ward, designed by Evans, Clark and Woollatt, which opened in 1943.

In 1948, at the formation of the National Health Service, the hospital came under the Sheffield Regional Hospital Board. The hospital comprised 423 beds at that time. The Intensive Care Unit was completed in 1963 and the Trent Wing was opened by Sir Keith Joseph in 1972. After services had transferred to the Queen's Medical Centre, the hospital closed in 1992. The main hospital block is now home to the offices of Nottingham City Clinical Commissioning Group and Nottingham CityCare Partnership.

References

Sources

External links
Nottingham University website: Nottingham Park, with early print of hospital
Dermatology in Nottingham: Dr B.R. Allen (history specifically of the dermatology department, but includes much background information on the whole hospital)

Buildings and structures completed in 1782
Hospital buildings completed in the 18th century
Defunct hospitals in England
Buildings and structures in Nottingham
1782 establishments in England
Hospitals disestablished in 1992